Ami Mishra  is an Indian singer-songwriter and playback singer from Mandla, Madhya Pradesh. He composed the song Hasi for the film Hamari Adhuri Kahani. Along with bollywood projects, he is also engaged in making independent music.

Early life

Ami was born in Mandla, Madhya Pradesh to a middle-class family. He has been brought up in different cities wherever his father was posted who is a government employee, his mother is a housewife and he has a younger brother. Ami did his schooling from Saraswati Higher Secondary School, Seoni and graduation from Rani Durgawati Post Graduation College, Mandla. After the graduation, he went to Indore for the post graduation and fortunately his passion for music developed there. He had a band in college and with his band he started participating in reality shows. Since then, he have had a keen interest in music.

Career

After completing the MBA from Indore Management Institute , Ami started working at a multinational company in Indore. He worked there for a some time but he found the corporate life boring and decided to make a career in music. He quit his job and started playing at restaurants and private parties. Although his parents were not happy with it but he continued pursuing his passion and he moved to Mumbai in 2014. After a struggle of seven months, he got a phone call from Vishesh Films that his song has been selected for a film. Ami made his debut with this song Hasi from the film Hamari Adhuri Kahani which's been directed by Mohit Suri. His latest song is Lost Without You from the film Half Girlfriend.

Discography

Awards
 Won 6th GiMA Awards – GiMA Award for Best Music Debut – "Hasi" (Hamari Adhuri Kahani)
 Nominated 8th Mirchi Music Awards – Upcoming male vocalist of the year – "Hasi" (Hamari Adhuri Kahani)
 Nominated 8th Mirchi Music Awards – Upcoming Music Composer of The Year – "Hasi (Male)"(Hamari Adhuri Kahani)

References

External links
 
 

Living people
1987 births
Indian male pop singers
Indian male singer-songwriters
Indian singer-songwriters
Bollywood playback singers
Indian male composers